Marandahalli is a small village which lies along the Bangalore–Tirupati national highway, in Kolar district near Mulbagal. Marandahalli is a small village with approximately 500 houses, a government school, a temple of Grama Devate Gangamma and a temple of Sri Anjaneya Swamy.

Sri Anjaneya Swamy Temple
Sri Anjaneya Swamy Temple in the village traces its history back 400 years. When Mughals attacked Vijayanagar empire ruled by Sri Krishnadevaraya, people sought safer destinations; the Raja of Punganur provided shelter at present-day Marandahalli. 

The temple was constructed by Brahmin scholars with the Idols of 'Sri Anjaneya Swamy, Sri Varadarajaru with Sridevi and Bhoodevi'. From then the temple has been renovated twice, the second time in 2000.

Along with the existing idols, Lord Shiva, Parvati and Ganapati idols were also installed at the time of renovation.

Festivals
Anajaneya swamy temple carries devotional festivals throughout the year.
 Madhwa Navami
 SriRama Navami
 Maha Shivaratri
 Varshikotsava (Kalyanatosava, Rathotsava and Shayanotsava)
 Vijaya Dashami
 Dhatri Hawana
 Hanuma Jayanti

Transportantion
From Bangalore both government and private buses. 
From Mulabagilu, government busses and private cars.

External links
Blog about the village

Villages in Kolar district